Alberto Cerri (born 16 April 1996) is an Italian professional footballer who plays as a striker for Serie B club Como, on loan from Cagliari.

Club career

Parma
On 30 March 2013, Cerri made his debut for Parma as a substitute replacing Amauri in the 76th minute of a 3–0  home win over Pescara at the age of 16 years and 348 days. On 6 April 2014, he made his second appearance as a substitute replacing Jonathan Biabiany in the 92nd minute of a 1–0 home win over Napoli.

Loan to Virtus Lanciano
On 28 August 2014, Cerri was signed by Serie B side Virtus Lanciano on a season-long loan deal. On 30 August he made his Serie B debut for Virtus Lanciano as a substitute replacing Gaetano Vastola in the 88th minute, and he scored his first professional goal in the 94th minute of a 3–3 away draw against Catania. On 20 September, Cerri scored his second goal in the 55th minute of a 5–1 home defeat against Frosinone. On 23 September he scored his third goal in the 75th minute of a 1–1 away draw against Brescia. On 29 September he scored his fourth goal in the 15th minute of a 1–1 home draw against Bari. On 25 April 2015, Cerri was sent off with a red card in the 77th minute of a 1–0 home defeat against Pescara. On 22 May he played his first entire match for Virtus Lanciano, a 1–0 away defeat against Bologna. Cerri ended his loan to Virtus Entella with 19 appearances, 4 goals and 1 assist.

Juventus
On 15 July 2015, Cerri was signed by Serie A side Juventus on a free transfer.

Loan to Cagliari
On 21 August 2015, Cerri was loaned to Serie B club Cagliari on a season-long loan deal. On 22 September, Cerri made his Serie B debut for Cagliari in a 3–1 away win over Virtus Entella; he was replaced by Federico Melchiorri in the 79th minute. On 7 November he played his first entire match for Cagliari, a 2–1 home win over Modena. On 3 December he played in the fourth round of Coppa Italia in a 1–0 away win over Sassuolo. On 9 December, Cerri scored his first goal for Cagliari in the 67th minute of a 3–1 away win over Virtus Lanciano. On 15 December he played in a 3–0 away defeat against Internazionale in the quarter-finals of Coppa Italia; he played the entire match. On 29 January 2016, Cerri scored his second goal, as a substitute, in the 78th minute of a 2–1 away win over Avellino. On 6 May he scored his third goal, again as a substitute, in the 87th minute of a 3–0 away win over Bari. Cerri ended his loan to Cagliari with 26 appearances, 3 goals and 4 assists.

Loan to SPAL and Pescara
On 1 August 2016, Cerri was signed by Serie B side SPAL on a six-month loan deal. On 7 August, Cerri made his debut for SPAL, and he scored his first goal in the 63rd minute of a 2–0 home win over Messina in the second round of Coppa Italia; he was replaced by Gianmarco Zigoni in the 70th minute. On 15 August he played in a 5–1 away defeat against Cagliari in the third round of Coppa Italia; he played the entire match. On 27 August he made his Serie B debut for SPAL in a 2–0 away defeat against Benevento; he played the entire match. On 22 October he scored his first goal for SPAL, in Serie B, in the 50th minute of a 3–1 home win over Carpi. Cerri ended his 6-month loan to SPAL with 17 appearances, 2 goals and 2 assists.

On 4 January 2017, Cerri was loaned to Serie A side Pescara on a 6-month loan deal. On 15 January he made his Serie A debut for Pescara as a substitute replacing Valerio Verre in the 70th minute of a 3–1 away defeat against Napoli. On 19 February, Cerri played his first entire match for Pescara, and he scored his first goal in Serie A in the 87th minute of a 5–0 home win over Genoa. On 4 March he scored his second goal in the 32nd minute of a 3–1 away defeat against Sampdoria. Cerri ended his loan to Pescara with 13 appearances, 2 goals and 1 assist.

Loan to Perugia
On 24 July 2017, Cerri was signed by Serie B club Perugia on a season-long loan deal. On 6 August he made his debut for Perugia in a 2–1 home win over Gubbio in the second round of Coppa Italia; he played the entire match. On 12 August he made his first hat-trick in his career in a 4–0 away win over Benevento in the third round of Coppa Italia. On 26 August he made his Serie B debut for Perugia, and he scored his first goal in the 13th minute of a 5–1 away win over Virtus Entella. On 11 September, Cerri scored his second goal in Serie B in the 31st minute of a 1–1 away draw against Cittadella. On 12 November he was sent off with a double yellow card in the 59th minute of a 1–0 away defeat against Venezia. On 6 November he scored his third goal, as a substitute, in the 75th minute of a 1–1 home draw against Avellino. On 30 November, Cerri played in the fourth round of Coppa Italia and he scored a goal in the 45th minute of an 8–3 away defeat against Udinese. On 10 March 2018, he scored his 10th goal of the season, in Serie B, in the 59th minute of a 2–0 home win over Foggia. Cerri ended his loan to Perugia with 34 appearances, 19 goals and 12 assists.

Loan to Cagliari
On 12 July 2018, Cerri signed a loan with Cagliari until 30 June 2019, with obligatory buy. He returned to Cagliari after the 2015–16 season. On 12 August he made his debut for Cagliari as a substitute replacing Leonardo Pavoletti in the 86th minute of a 2–1 home win over Palermo in the third round of Coppa Italia. One week later he made his Serie A debut again as a substitute replacing Artur Ioniţă for the last 17 minutes of a 2–0 away defeat against Empoli. On 22 September, Cerri played his first match as a starter for Cagliari. a 2–0 away defeat against Parma, he was replaced by Diego Farias in the 60th minute.

Cagliari
On 19 February 2019, Cagliari bought Cerri for €9 million from Juventus.

Second loan to SPAL
On 31 January 2020, he rejoined SPAL on loan until the end of the 2019–20 season.

Loan to Como
On 17 August 2021, he joined Como on a season-long loan.

International career
Cerri represented Italy at the U-16, U-17, U-18, U-19 and U-21 level. With the Italy U17 side he took part at the 2013 UEFA European Under-17 Championship and at the 2013 FIFA U-17 World Cup.

He made his debut with Italy U21 on 12 August 2015, in a friendly match against Hungary.

In June 2017, he was included in the Italy under-21 squad for the 2017 UEFA European Under-21 Championship by manager Luigi Di Biagio. Italy were eliminated in the semi-finals following a 3–1 defeat to Spain on 27 June.

Career statistics

Club

Honours

Club
Cagliari
 Serie B: 2015–16

SPAL
 Serie B: 2016–17

International
Italy U17 
 UEFA European Under-17 Championship runner-up: 2013

References

External links

FIGC profile

1996 births
Living people
Sportspeople from Parma
Association football forwards
Italian footballers
Italy youth international footballers
Italy under-21 international footballers
Serie A players
Serie B players
Parma Calcio 1913 players
S.S. Virtus Lanciano 1924 players
Juventus F.C. players
Cagliari Calcio players
S.P.A.L. players
Delfino Pescara 1936 players
A.C. Perugia Calcio players
Como 1907 players
Footballers from Emilia-Romagna